Aurore is a feminine French given name. Notable people with the name include:

Aurore Auteuil (born 1980), French actress and the oldest daughter of Anne Jousset and Daniel Auteuil
Aurore Chabot (born 1949), American ceramist 
Aurore Clément (born 1945), French actress
Aurore Gagnon (1909–1920), Canadian victim of child abuse
Aurore Jéan (born 1985), French cross-country skier
Aurore Kassambara (born 1979), French athlete who specialises in the hurdles
Aurore Lalucq, French politician
Aurore Martin (born 1978), Basque politician for the Abertzale Basque separatist party Batasuna
Aurore Mongel (born 1982), French Olympic and national record holding butterfly swimmer
Aurore Palmgren (1880–1961), Swedish film actress
Aurore Trayan (born 1980), French archer

Fictional characters:
 Aurore, in the 2016 film A Wedding

See also
Aurora (given name)

French feminine given names